is a Japanese football player for V-Varen Nagasaki.

National team career
In August 2007, Okui was elected Japan U-17 national team for 2007 U-17 World Cup, but he did not play in the matches.

Club statistics
Updated to 23 February 2018.

References

External links

Profile at Omiya Ardija

1990 births
Living people
Waseda University alumni
Association football people from Osaka Prefecture
People from Toyonaka, Osaka
Japanese footballers
J1 League players
J2 League players
Vissel Kobe players
Omiya Ardija players
Shimizu S-Pulse players
V-Varen Nagasaki players
Association football midfielders